12 is the twelfth full-length album by German singer Herbert Grönemeyer, released in March 2007. It was recorded between 2006 and 2007 in London and was produced by Alex Silva and Herbert Grönemeyer.
All songs were written by Grönemeyer, except the song "Spur" to which Arezu Weitholz contributed parts of the lyrics.

The album reached the number one position in the German charts. The first single "Stück vom Himmel", became Grönemeyer's third number-one single in Germany after "Mensch" and "Zeit, dass sich was dreht".

Track listing

Charts

Weekly charts

Year-end charts

Certifications 
 Germany – 4× Platinum (800,000 copies)
 Austria – 3× Platinum (90,000 copies)
 Switzerland – 3× Platinum (90,000 copies)
 Europe – Platinum (1,000,000 copies)

References

2007 albums
German-language albums
EMI Records albums
Herbert Grönemeyer albums
Albums produced by Alex Silva